The White Monkey is a 1925 American silent drama film, directed by Phil Rosen and starring Barbara La Marr, Thomas Holding, and Henry Victor. It was released by First National Pictures on June 7, 1925.

Plot
As described in a film magazine review, Fleur, daughter of Soames Forsyte, marries Michael Mont, whose best friend Wilfrid Desert, author, painter, and traveler, is also in love with her. He knows that Fleur married Michael without any love for him. When Fleur refuses to allow him to leave London, he decides that he has a chance to win her. Wilfrid tells Michael that he will win her away from him if he can. Michael, also of the generation after the war, refuses to coerce Fleur or attempt any heroics with Wilfred. He later discovers them together after she has told him that she has gone.

Cast list

References

External links

Films based on works by John Galsworthy
Films directed by Phil Rosen
1925 drama films
1925 films
Silent American drama films
American silent feature films
American black-and-white films
First National Pictures films
1920s American films